Dulkan (also Romanized as Dūlkān, Doolkan, and Dūlakān; also known as Benaze) is a village in Alan Rural District, in the Central District of Sardasht County, West Azerbaijan Province, Iran. At the 2006 census, its population was 286, in 64 families.

References 

Populated places in Sardasht County